Pantelides may refer to:

Leonidas Pantelides, Greek politician
Mike Pantelides, American politician
Sokrates Pantelides, American engineer
Pantelides algorithm